Catalysts is a monthly peer-reviewed open-access scientific journal covering catalysts and catalyzed reactions. The journal was established in 2013 and is published by MDPI. The journal has a partnership with the Swiss Chemical Society. The editor-in-chief is Keith Hohn (Kansas State University).

Abstracting and indexing 
The journal is abstracted and indexed in:

According to the Journal Citation Reports, the journal has a 2020 impact factor of 4.146.

References

External links

chemistry journals
MDPI academic journals
English-language journals
Publications established in 2013
Creative Commons Attribution-licensed journals